The Julie Ruin is an American band formed in 2010 in New York City. The band rehearses in Greenpoint, Brooklyn, and records at Oscilloscope and Figure 8 Recording in Brooklyn. Band members include lead vocalist Kathleen Hanna, guitarist Sara Landeau, bassist Kathi Wilcox, drummer Carmine Covelli and keyboardist Kenny Mellman.

In December 2010, the Julie Ruin previewed a performance at the Knitting Factory in Brooklyn, New York.

In 2012, the Julie Ruin released the song "Girls Like Us," featuring queercore artist Vaginal Davis, as a free download as part of a series inspired by the book Real Man Adventures by T. Cooper.

The band's first album, Run Fast, was released on September 3, 2013, by Dischord Records. The first track, "Oh Come On," was released in June of that year.

The band's second album, Hit Reset, was released on July 8, 2016, by Hardly Art Records. The first track "I Decide" was released on April 11, 2016.

Discography
Run Fast (2013)
Hit Reset (2016)

References

External links
TheJulieRuin.com

Musical groups from New York City
Musical groups established in 2010
Punk rock groups from New York (state)
Musical quartets
2010 establishments in New York City